East Antrim can refer to:

The eastern part of County Antrim
East Antrim (Assembly constituency)
East Antrim (UK Parliament constituency)